The FED 2 was a 35 mm rangefinder camera introduced in 1955 by FED. The name of FED comes from the initial of Felix Edmundovich Dzerzhinsky.

Major features
The FED 2 is a new design that is quite different from the FED 1. It has a longer rangefinder base (67 mm), a combined viewfinder and rangefinder window, adjustable diopter for the viewing window, a self timer, and a detachable back for film loading.

Variations
There are six models.

 FED 2a was introduced in 1955.
 FED 2b has flash sync added. The new shutter speed dial has the reference point on a center post that rotates with the dial as the shutter is fired.
 FED 2c has the flash sync port moved to the top deck from the body. It also has a mushroom-shaped film advance knob.
 FED 2d has a new set of shutter speeds, from 1/30 to 1/500, instead of the older set of 1/25 to 1/500.
 FED 2L is the only factory-designated model number; all other models are stamped FED 2 by the factory. The body is identical to the FED 2d body but the lens supplied is an Industar-61 with Lanthane glass instead of the Industar-26 used in models 2b to 2d.
 FED 2e is a FED 3b with the FED 2d shutter that does not have the slow speeds. Similar to the 3b, it does not have strap lugs but has a film-advance lever. Production ended around 1970.

Operation
To load a film, two locks in the base of the camera need to be turned. The entire back and bottom can then be removed as a single unit, allowing easy access to the film chamber. Standard 35 mm film cassettes are used, with film being wound onto a removable take-up spool (the latter often becomes difficult to remove on older cameras). Winding the film cocks the shutter and forwards the frame counter simultaneously. The FED 2 has a manual frame counter located below the wind-on knob, which must be reset by hand when loading film.

Shutter
The Fed 2 has a curtain shutter with speeds from B, 1/25-1/500s. After detaching the back, two screws on under the camera allow you to adjust the spring tension and change the shutter speeds, which may have become slow over time. As with similar cameras, it is important to cock the shutter before operating the shutter speed dial. Failing to do so may harm the mechanism. When firing, this dial will rotate. After re-cocking, the speed set will be indicated correctly again.

Lens
The FED takes 39 mm screw lenses. The one shown here is a 50mm Jupiter-8 lens. Many FEDs come with Industar lenses. On this lens, the aperture is set on the front and focusing is done with a focusing ring. The rangefinder is coupled to the lens. The field of view in the viewfinder is that of a 5 cm lens. For other focal lengths, a separate turret viewfinder was placed on the accessory shoe.

External links

 Matt's Cameras: FED 2
 Lionel's FED 2 overview at 35mm-compact.com
 Fed 2  at www.collection-appareils.com  by Sylvain Halgand
 FED section at Retrography.com  by Simon Simonsen, Denmark

Rangefinder cameras